State Route 271 (SR 271), also known as Belfast Farmington Road, is a short  long north-south state highway in Marshall County, Tennessee. It serves as a connection between the communities of Belfast and Farmington.

Route description

SR 271 begins in Belfast at an intersection with US 431 (SR 50). It winds its way north to cross a bridge over a creek before passing through mix of rural farmland and hilly wooded terrain for several miles. The highway then crosses another creek before entering Farmington and coming to an end at an intersection between US 31A (SR 11) and SR 64. The entire route of SR 271 is a rural two-lane highway.

Major intersections

References

271
Transportation in Marshall County, Tennessee